The Andrini Brothers were an Italian American musical outfit playing classical, opera, and ballo liscio music.

Bibliography
Andrini, Frank, & Andrini Lawrence. Mills mandolin solos. With guitar accompaniment (plectrum style) As specially arranged and featured by Frank and Lawrence Andrini. New York, NY: Mills Music, Inc., 1923.

Further reading
Mignano Crawford, Sheri. Mandolins, Like Salami. Zighi Baci Publishing: Petaluma, CA, 2005.

References

Musicians from California
Music of California
Music of the San Francisco Bay Area
Musicians from the San Francisco Bay Area
American_mandolinists
Italian emigrants to the United States